Jack Gray (May 12, 1911 – March 7, 1992) was an American college basketball player and coach.

Gray played for the Texas Longhorns men's basketball team from 1933 to 1935. As a player, he set a Southwest Conference record with 32 points in 1933  which stood for 16 years. Gray was a First-Team All-American guard in 1935 and was All-SWC all three years of his varsity career. He was known for his one-handed "push" shot, a precursor of the jump shot.

With one year of coaching experience, Gray took over the coaching job at age 25. In his first six years as coach beginning in 1937, he led the  Longhorns to five winning seasons and led the Longhorns to their first Elite Eight in the first NCAA tournament in 1939. After returning from World War II, Gray led the Longhorns to their first Final Four in the 1947 NCAA tournament. He coached Basketball Hall of Famer Slater Martin from 1944 to 1949.

Gray got his team in the National Invitation Tournament in 1948, their first AP Poll ranking (#20 in 1949).

Gray ranks third all-time in Longhorns basketball history in wins with 194 victories to 97 losses and had a final Southwest Conference record of 89–55. He was head coach for 12 years, which as of 2011, ranked as the second-longest basketball coaching term at University of Texas.

Head coaching record

See also
 List of NCAA Division I Men's Final Four appearances by coach

References

1911 births
1992 deaths
All-American college men's basketball players
American men's basketball coaches
American men's basketball players
Basketball coaches from Texas
Basketball players from Texas
College men's basketball head coaches in the United States
People from Van Zandt County, Texas
Texas Longhorns men's basketball coaches
Texas Longhorns men's basketball players